Albreda Lake is a lake in Thompson-Nicola Regional District in the Interior region of British Columbia, Canada. It is in the Pacific Ocean drainage basin.

The primary inflow, at the northeast, and outflow, at the southeast, is the Albreda River, which flows via the North Thompson River, the Thompson River and the Fraser River to the Pacific Ocean.

References

Lakes of British Columbia
Kamloops Division Yale Land District